Luden is a surname. Notable people with the surname include:

 Heinrich Luden (1778-1847), German historian
 Jack Luden (1902-1951), American film actor
 William H. Luden (1859-1949), American businessman
 Luden's, a brand of cough drop developed by William H. Luden

See also
 
 Ludens (disambiguation)